The 1942 Boston College Eagles football team was an American football team that represented Boston College as an independent during the 1942 college football season. In their second year under head coach Denny Myers, the Eagles compiled an 8–1 record in the regular season, were ranked No. 8 in the final AP poll, and went on to lose to Alabama in the 1943 Orange Bowl. The Eagles captured the Lambert-Meadowlands Trophy (emblematic of the 'Eastern championship').

Boston College won its first eight games of the season, climbing to No. 1 in the AP Poll, but lost to rival Holy Cross in the final game of the regular season. The result, however, was a stunning rout loss, 12–55. The Eagles team canceled their planned post-game celebration at the Cocoanut Grove nightclub in Boston, which inadvertently saved the team from perishing along with 492 others in the Cocoanut Grove fire that occurred that night.

Team co-captain and fullback Mike Holovak was a consensus pick on the 1942 All-America team and finished fourth in Heisman Trophy voting. He finished his career as Boston College's all-time leading rusher, with 2,011 yards and 23 touchdowns. Holovak returned to coach the Eagles from 1951 to 1959.

Boston College ranked first nationally in rushing defense (48.9 yards allowed per game) and second in rushing offense (292.8 yards per game). They also ranked third nationally in both total offense (410.7 yards per game) and total defense (131.8 yards per game) and fourth in scoring offense (28.2 points per game).

The team played all of its regular season games at Fenway Park in Boston.

Schedule

References

Boston College
Boston College Eagles football seasons
Lambert-Meadowlands Trophy seasons
Boston College Eagles football
1940s in Boston